Joseph Zalinsky (born January 3, 2003) is an American soccer player who plays as a defender for Rutgers Scarlet Knights.

A resident of Brick Township, New Jersey, Zalinsky played prep soccer at Brick Memorial High School.

Career
Zalinsky has played with the New York Red Bulls academy since 2016.

During the 2020 USL Championship season Zalinsky appeared for New York Red Bulls II. He made his debut on September 9, 2020, starting in a 6–0 win over Philadelphia Union II.

In the fall of 2021, Zalinsky moved to Rutgers University to play college soccer.

References

External links 
 
 ussoccerda.com profile

2003 births
Living people
People from Brick Township, New Jersey
Brick Memorial High School alumni
American soccer players
New York Red Bulls II players
Association football defenders
Soccer players from New Jersey
Sportspeople from Ocean County, New Jersey
USL Championship players
United States men's youth international soccer players
Rutgers Scarlet Knights men's soccer players